The Manchac Swamp Bridge is a twin concrete trestle bridge in the US state of Louisiana. Some claim it is the longest toll-free road bridge in the world. Opening in 1979, its piles were driven  beneath the swamp and with the cost of the span being $7 million per mile (/km) (equivalent to $ per mile (/km) in ) to complete.

U.S. Route 51

See also
 
 
 
 List of bridges in the United States
 List of longest bridges

References

Bridges completed in 1979
Buildings and structures in St. John the Baptist Parish, Louisiana
Buildings and structures in Tangipahoa Parish, Louisiana
Transportation in Tangipahoa Parish, Louisiana
Road bridges in Louisiana
Interstate 55
Bridges on the Interstate Highway System
Transportation in St. John the Baptist Parish, Louisiana
Concrete bridges in the United States
Trestle bridges in the United States